Semelai is an Austroasiatic language spoken in the Malay Peninsula. It belongs to the Southern branch of the Aslian language subgrouping.  The Semelai reside predominantly around the Bera, Serting and associated river systems in the states of Pahang, Negeri Sembilan and Johor.

Phonology 
Semelai has 32 consonants and 20 vowels.

 
 Stops /p t c k/ are heard as [p̚ t̚ c̚ k̚] word-final position.
 Palatal sounds /c ɟ/ are slightly affricated as [cᶝ ɟᶽ] when in word-initial position.
 /s/ may occur as [s] or [ɕ] within free variation.
 Nasals /m n ɲ ŋ/ can occur as prestopped [ᵇm ᵈn ᶡɲ ᶢŋ] when in word-final position.
 /r/ can be heard as [ɾ] when in word-final position. When preceded by a nasal /n/ it is heard as [ᵈr].
 /w j/ are heard as off-glides [ ʷ,  ʲ] when in word-final position. After nasal vowels, they are then heard as nasalized [ ʷ̃, ʲ̃].

Vowels are also distinguished with nasal counterparts:

 /ɒ/ is phonetically noted as [ɒ̙].

Notes

References

External links
 http://projekt.ht.lu.se/rwaai RWAAI (Repository and Workspace for Austroasiatic Intangible Heritage)
 http://hdl.handle.net/10050/00-0000-0000-0003-66E3-8@view Semelai in RWAAI Digital Archive

Languages of Malaysia
Aslian languages